The Charles S. Roberts Awards (or CSR Awards) is an annual award for excellence in the historical wargaming hobby. It was named in honor of Charles S. Roberts the "Father of Wargaming" who founded Avalon Hill. The award is informally called a "Charlie" and officially called a "Charles S. Roberts Award". The Wargamer magazine called it "very prestigious". The Award is managed by the Charles S. Roberts Award Committee which has no commercial sponsorship, made up of designers, writers and hobbyists. It is a "people's award" with winners chosen through votes submitted by fans.

History

Created at the first Origins Game Convention in 1975, the awards were the brainchild of Canadian game store owner John Mansfield. Originally the awards were titled the "Origins Awards" but were informally known as the Charles Roberts Awards and it was only in 1988 that Charles Roberts officially agreed to let his name be used. The split from the Origins Awards occurred in 1987, after Fortress America by Milton Bradley Company won an award. Fortress America was not considered a traditional historical wargame by members of the wargaming community with mechanics and a target audience more akin to Risk; and there was concern that because of the large print run of a Milton Bradley product, many of the voters came from outside the traditional wargaming hobby flooding out smaller run titles.

Prior to 2000, the awards were given at the Origins Game Fair. From 2000–2012, the awards were presented at the World Boardgaming Championships (formerly "AvalonCon"). The awards were not given from 2013–2018.

Current award 

In 2020, a group of gamers and industry figures restarted the award under auspices of Chairman Rodger B. MacGowan and directed and operated by Tim Tow. Like the original, it is a non-profit and not associated with commercial interests. There are an increased number of categories including art, print and play (called "amateur wargames"), and computer wargame categories.

The Awards also included the Charles Roberts Awards Hall of Fame which recognized game designers and producers that have made a significant and long lasting contribution to the contemporary board wargaming hobby.

Recent award winners

2003
Source:
Best Pre–World War II Boardgame—Age of Napoleon (Phalanx Games)
Best World War II Boardgame—Europe Engulfed (GMT Games LLC)
Best Modern Era Boardgame—Lock 'n Load (Shrapnel Games)
Best Magazine-Published Boardgame—Ignorant Armies (Strategy & Tactics/Decision)
Best DTP-Produced Boardgame—Thunder on South Mountain (Blue Guidon)
Best Wargame Graphics—Ardennes '44 (GMT Games LLC)
Best Professional Wargame Magazine—Against The Odds
Best Amateur Wargame Magazine—Panzerschreck (Minden Games)
Best Game Review or Game Analysis—Drive on Stalingrad, Paper Wars #50
Best Historical or Scenario Article—"Napoleon at the Berezina", Against the Odds Vol.1 No.4
James F. Dunnigan Award, To a Game Designer, Developer, Graphic Artist or Game for outstanding achievement – Rick Young and Jesse Evans, Europe Engulfed (GMT Games LLC)
Clausewitz Award HALL OF FAME—Kevin Zucker

2004
Source:
Best Pre–World War II Boardgame—Sword of Rome (GMT Games)
Best World War II Boardgame—ASL Starter Kit #1 (Multi-Man Publishing)
Best Modern Era Boardgame—Downtown (GMT Games)
Best Magazine-Published Boardgame—Fortress Berlin (Against the Odds)
Best DTP-Produced Boardgame—Louisiana Tigers (BSO Games)
Best Wargame Graphics—Downtown (GMT Games)
Best Professional Wargame Magazine—(tie) Against The Odds and Strategy & Tactics
Best Amateur Wargame Magazine—Panzerschreck (Minden Games)
Best Game Review or Game Analysis—no winner designated
Best Historical or Scenario Article—S&T Sedan, by Ty Bomba
Best Pre-20th Century PC Game—Rome: Total War (Total War Games)
Best 20th Century+ PC Game—Battles in Normandy (Strategic Studies Group)
James F. Dunnigan Award, To a Game Designer, Developer, Graphic Artist or Game for outstanding achievement—Lee Brimmicombe Wood for Downtown (GMT Games)
Clausewitz Award HALL OF FAME—JD Webster

2005
Source:
Best Pre–World War II Boardgame—Bonaparte at Marengo (Simmons Games)
Best World War II Boardgame—Empire of the Sun (GMT Games LLC)
Best Modern Era Boardgame—Twilight Struggle (GMT Games LLC)
Best Magazine-Published Boardgame—Chennault's First Fight (Against The Odds #12)
Best DTP-Produced Boardgame—Death in the Trenches (Schutze Games)
Best Wargame Graphics—(tie) Empire of the Sun (GMT Games LLC) and Fire in the Sky (MMP/The Gamers)
Best Professional Wargame Magazine—Against The Odds
Best Amateur Wargame Magazine—Panzerschreck (Minden Games)
Best Game Review or Game Analysis—Empire of the Sun Strategy Concepts (C3i #17)
Best Historical or Scenario Article—not awarded
Best Pre-20th Century PC Game—Crown of Glory (Matrix Games)
Best 20th Century+ PC Game—not awarded
James F. Dunnigan Award, To a Game Designer, Developer, Graphic Artist or Game for outstanding achievement—Ananda Gupta and Jason Matthews, Twilight Struggle (GMT Games LLC)
Clausewitz Award HALL OF FAME—none

2006
Source:
Best Pre–World War II Boardgame—Here I Stand (GMT Games LLC)
Best World War II Boardgame—A Victory Lost (Multi-Man Publishing)
Best Modern Era Boardgame—Winged Horse: Campaigns in Vietnam, 1965–66 (S&T #239)
Best DTP-Produced Boardgame—Battle of the Little Bighorn (Khyber Pass Games)
Best Magazine-Published Boardgame—Golden Horde: Kulikovo 1380 (Against the Odds #18)
Best Wargame Graphics—A Victory Lost (Multi-Man Publishing)
Best Professional Wargame Magazine—Against The Odds
Best Amateur Wargame Magazine—Line of Departure (Jim Werbaneth)
James F. Dunnigan Award, To a Game Designer, Developer, Graphic Artist or Game for outstanding achievement—Tetsuya Nakamura, A Victory Lost (Multi-Man Publishing)
Clausewitz Award HALL OF FAME—none

2007
Source:
Best Pre–World War II Boardgame—1914: Twilight in the East (GMT Games LLC)
Best World War II Boardgame—Case Blue (MMP/The Gamers)
Best Modern Era Boardgame—World at War: Eisenbach Gap (Lock 'n Load Publishing)
Best DTP-Produced Boardgame—Rosebud: Prelude to Little Bighorn (Khyber Pass Games)
Best Magazine-Published Boardgame—Not War But Murder (Against the Odds #19)
Best Wargame Graphics (tie)—1914: Twilight in the East (GMT Games LLC) and Overlord: D-Day and the Beachhead Battles (New England Simulations)
Best Professional Wargame Magazine—Against The Odds
Best Amateur Wargame Magazine—Line of Departure (Jim Werbaneth)
Best Game Review or Game Analysis—Against the Odds #19: "The Evolution of Cards and Wargames", by John Prados
Best Historical or Scenario Article—Against the Odds #19, "Not War But Murder: The Cold Harbor Campaign – 1864", by Michael Rinella
James F. Dunnigan Award, To a Game Designer, Developer, Graphic Artist or Game for outstanding achievement—Dean Essig, Designer, Case Blue and OCS series (MMP/The Gamers)
Best Pre-20th Century Era Computer Wargame—Empires in Arms (Matrix Games)
Best 20th Century Era Computer Wargame—Guns of August 1914–1918 (Matrix Games)
Clausewitz Award HALL OF FAME—none

2008
Source:
Best Pre–World War II Boardgame—Warriors of God (Multi Man Publications, Inc.)
Best World War II Boardgame—Conflict of Heroes (Academy Games)
Best Modern Era Boardgame—Red Dragon Rising: The Coming War with China (Decision Games)
Best DTP-Produced Boardgame—June '44 (DDH Games)
Best Magazine-Published Boardgame—Iwo Jima: Rage Against the Marines (Operations, MMP)
Best Wargame Graphics—Conflict of Heroes (Academy Games)
Best Professional Wargame Magazine—C3i Magazine (RBM Publication)
Best Amateur Wargame Magazine—Line of Departure (Jim Werbaneth)
Best Game Review or Game Analysis (tie)—Empire of the Sun: Opening Strategy, by Mark Herman (C3i Magazine) and Top 20 Games – A Look Back by Steve Carey (C3i Magazine)
Best Historical or Scenario Article (tie)—Combat Commander: Variant Rules by Chad Jensen and John Foley (C3i Magazine) and Flying Colors: Trafalgar Campaign by Mark Barker (C3i Magazine)
James F. Dunnigan Award, To a Game Designer, Developer, Graphic Artist or Game for outstanding achievement—Uwe Eickert
Best Pre-20th Century Era Computer Wargame—none
Best 20th Century Era Computer Wargame—none
Clausewitz Award HALL OF FAME—none

2009
Source:
Best Ancient to Napoleonic Era Board Wargame – A Most Dangerous Time: Japan in Chaos, 1570–1584, Multi Man Publications, Inc.
Best Post-Napoleonic to Pre–World War II Era Board Wargame – Battle Above the Clouds, Multi Man Publications, Inc.
Best World War II Era Board Wargame – D-Day at Omaha Beach, Decision Games
Best Post-WW2 Era Board Wargame – Elusive Victory, GMT Games
Best Pre-20th Century Era Computer Wargame – Field of Glory, Slitherine
 Best 20th Century Era – Modern Computer Wargame – War in the Pacific – Admiral's Edition, Matrix Games
Best Science-Fiction or Fantasy Board Wargame – Struggle for the Galactic Empire, Decision Games
Best Magazine Game – Deathride: Mars-la-Tour 1870, Against the Odds magazine (ATO)
Best Desktop Published (DTP)/Print-and-Play Game – Zulus on the Ramparts!, Victory Point Games
Best Expansion or Supplement for an Existing Game – Panzerblitz Hill of Death mini-module Carentan, Multi Man Publications, Inc.
Best Board Game Graphics – Battle Above the Clouds, Multi Man Publications, Inc.
Best Professional Game Magazine – Battles magazine (by Olivier Revenu)
Best Amateur Game Magazine – Panzer Digest (by Gary Graber), Minden Games
Best Historical/Scenario Article – For the People – 10th Anniversary Variant Rules (C3i #23) by Mark Herman
Best Game Review or Analysis Article – Liberty Roads (Battles Magazine 2)
James F. Dunnigan Design Elegance Award – John Butterfield
Clausewitz Award HALL OF FAME – John Butterfield

2010
Source:
Best Ancient to Napoleonic Era Board Wargame – Washington's War (by Mark Herman), GMT Games
Best Post-Napoleonic to Pre-World War 2 Era Board Wargame – The Spanish Civil War 1936–1939 (by Javier Romero), GMT Games
Best World War 2 Era Board Wargame – Normandy '44 (by Mark Simonitch), GMT Games
Best Post-WW2 Era Board Wargame – Labyrinth: The War on Terror (by Volko Ruhnke), GMT Games
Best Pre-20th Century Era Computer Wargame – Civilization V
Best 20th Century Era – Modern Computer Wargame – Gary Grigsby's War in the East: The German-Soviet War 1941–1945 (2by3 Games/ Matrix)
Best Science-Fiction or Fantasy Board Wargame – War of the Ring Collector's Edition (by Roberto di Meglio, Marco Maggi, Francesco Nepitello), Fantasy Flight Games
Best Science-Fiction or Fantasy Computer Wargame – Mass Effect 2
Best Magazine Game – A Week in Hell (by Laurent Guenette), Battles magazine
Best Desktop Published (DTP)/Print-and-Play/Postcard Game – We Must Tell the Emperor (by Steve Carey), Victory Point Games
Best Expansion or Supplement for an Existing Game – Combat Commander: Battle Pack #3 – Normandy (by John Foley), GMT Games
Best Board Game Graphics – Normandy '44 (GMT)
Best Computer Game Graphics – Gary Grigsby's War in the East: The German-Soviet War 1941–1945 (2by3 Games/ Matrix)
Best Professional Game Magazine – Battles Magazine
Best Amateur Game Magazine – Line of Departure
Best Historical/Scenario Article – Joel Toppen, History of the Peloponnesian War (C3i #24)
Best Game Review or Analysis Article – Mark Herman, Washington's War, Art of Asymmetrical Strategy (C3i#24)
James F. Dunnigan Design Elegance Award – Labyrinth: The War on terror
Clausewitz Award HALL OF FAME – Richard Borg

2011
Source:
Best Ancient to Napoleonic Era Board Wargame – Sekigahara (by Matthew Calkins), GMT Games
Best Post-Napoleonic to Pre-World War 2 Era Board Wargame – None But Heroes (by Dean Essig), Multi Man Publications, Inc. (MMP)
Best Best World War 2 Era Board Wargame- No Retreat: The Russian Front Deluxe Edition (by Carl Paradis), GMT Games
Best Post-WW2 Era Board Wargame – Lock 'n Load: Heroes of the Gap (by Pete Abrams, Mark H. Walker), Lock 'n Load Publishing
Best Pre-20th Century Era Computer Wargame – Shogun 2 Total War
Best 20th Century Era – Modern Computer Wargame – Combat Mission: Battle for Normandy
Best Science-Fiction or Fantasy Board Wargame – Space Empires 4X (by Jim Krohn), GMT Games
Best Science-Fiction or Fantasy Computer Wargame – Ravenmark: Scourge of Estellion
Best Magazine Game – Into the Bastards! – First tank battle (by Nicolas Rident), Battles magazine
Best Desktop Published (DTP)/Print-and-Play/Postcard Game – The Battle of Halle 1806 (by Dennis A. Spors, James Soto, Monte Mattson, Michael Neylan), LA Bataille ME Premier
Best Expansion or Supplement for an Existing Game – Advanced Squad Leader: Starter Kit Expansion Pack #1 (by Ken Dunn), Multi Man Publications, Inc. (MMP)
Best Board Game Graphics – Where The Eagles Dare MMP
Best Computer Game Graphics – Shogun 2 Total War
Best Professional Game Magazine – Battles Magazine
Best Amateur Game Magazine – Line of Departure
Best Historical/Scenario Article – To Script or Not to Script, that is the question? (Mark Herman C3i #25
Best Game Review or Analysis Article – Labyrinth, David Hughes
James F. Dunnigan Design Elegance Award – Adam Starkweather
Clausewitz Award HALL OF FAME – Ed Wimble

2012
Source:
Best Ancient to Napoleonic Era Board Wargame: The Battle of Fontenoy (by Paul Dangel), Clash of Arms Games
Best Post-Napoleonic to Pre-World War 2 Era Board Wargame: Bloody April (by Terry Simo), GMT Games
Best World War 2 Era Board Wargame: Red Winter (by Mark Mokszycki), GMT Games
Best Post-WW2 Era Board Wargame: Andean Abyss (by Volko Ruhnke), GMT Games
Best Pre-20th Century Era Computer Wargame: Levee en Masse (by John Welch), Victory Point Games
Best 20th Century Era – Modern Computer Wargame: Battle of the Bulge, Shenandoah Studios
Best Science-Fiction or Fantasy Board Wargame: Star Wars: X-Wing Miniatures Game (by Jeffrey Kniffen), Fantasy Flight Games
Best Science-Fiction or Fantasy Computer Wargame: X-Com: Enemy Unknown, Firaxis 2K Games
Best Magazine Game: Beyond Waterloo (by John Prados), Against the Odds magazine (ATO)
Best Desktop Published (DTP) / Print-and-Play / Postcard Game: City of Confusion: The Battle for Hue, Tet 1968 (by Paul Rohrbaugh), High Flying Dice Games
Best Expansion or Supplement for an Existing Game: Festung Budapest (by Bill Cirillo), Multi Man Publications, Inc. (MMP)
Best Board Game Graphics: The Battle of Fontenoy (by Charles Kibler), Clash of Arms Games
Best Computer Game Graphics: Battle of the Bulge, Shenandoah Studios
Best Professional Game Magazine: C3i, RBM Publications
Best Amateur Game Magazine: 1914 Dispatches, Oregon Consim Gamers
Best Historical/Scenario Article: 1914 – A postwar Solution for Austria-Hungary's Mobilization (Michael Resch C3i nr 26)
Best Game Review or Analysis Article: For the People – Defending the Union (by Dave Dockter and Mark Herman), C3i Magazine
James F. Dunnigan Design Elegance Award: Dean Essig
Clausewitz Award HALL OF FAME: Brian Youse

2019
Source:
Best Ancients to Pre-Napoleonic War Game: Nevsky: Teutons and Rus in Collision
Best Napoleonic Era War Game: Quatre Bras 1815
Best Post-Napoleonic Pre-WWII War Game: Death Valley: Battles of Shenandoah 
Best WW2 Era War Game: U-BOOT The Board Game
Best Amateur/Print-n-Play War Game: Federation Stellar Force
Best Game Review or Analysis: The Players Aid 
Best Modern Era Computer War Game: Command: Modern Operations
Best Sci-Fi/Fantasy Computer War Game: Stellaris
Best Computer War Game Expansion or Update: Through the Ages: New Leaders and Wonders
Best Computer War Game Graphics: Unity of Command II
Best Pre-20th Century Computer War Game: Julius Caesar
Best Amateur War Gaming Magazine: War Diary
Best Magazine Board War Game: Campaigns of 1777 (Strategy and Tactics magazine)
Best Postcard/Small Format Board War Game: Imua! The Unification of Hawaii, 1795
Best Professional War Game Magazine: C3i
Science Fiction or Fantasy War Game: Dune
Best Solitaire/Co-Operative War Game: UBOOT The Board Game
Best War Game Playing Components: UBOOT The Board Game
Best War Game Rules: UBOOT The Board Game
Best War Game Map Graphics: UBOOT The Board Game
Best Computer Assist Module: UBOOT The Board Game
Best Original Box Cover Art: UBOOT The Board Game
Best Expansion or Supplement: Time of Crisis: Age of Iron and Rust
Best Post-WW2, Cold War, and Hypothetical Era: Storming the Gap: World at War '85
Best Game Review or Analysis Article: (tie) Evolution of Historical Small Unit Tactic Board Wargames by Robert Carroll and OCS 101 Vitebsk Introductory Scenario by Chip Saltsman
Clausewitz Award HALL OF FAME: Rich Banner
James F. Dunnigan Award for Design and Playability: Volke Ruhnke
War Boardgame of the Year: UBOOT The Board Game

2020
Source:
Ancients to Medieval Board Wargame Caesar: Rome vs. Gaul GMT
Early Gunpowder Board Wargame Imperial Struggle GMT
Napoleonic Era Board Wargame The Shores of Tripoli Fort Circle Games
Late GunPowder Era Board Wargames Freedom! Phalanx
American Civil War (ACW) Board Wargames Chancellorsville 1863 Worthington
WWI Board Wargames Verdun 1916: Steel Inferno Fellowship of Simulations
WW2 Board Wargames The Jaws of Victory: Battle of Korsun-Cherkassy Pocket – January/February 1944  New England Simulations
Modern, Hypothetical Board Wargame Brotherhood & Unity: War in Bosnia and Herzegovina 1992-1995 Compass
SciFi Fantasy Board Stellar Horizons Compass
SF Fantasy Computer Wargame Shadow Empire Matrix Games and Root Dire Wolf
Pre-20th Century Computer Wargame Crusader Kings III Paradox Interactive and Field of Glory II: Medieval Slitherine
Modern Era Computer Wargame Panzer Corps 2
Computer Wargame Expansion Field of Glory Empires – Persia 550 – 330 BCE  Slitherine Ltd and Order of Battle: Red Storm  Slitherine
Computer Wargame Graphics Panzer Corps 2
Board Game Assist Module Dune (Treachery Online)
Solitaire/Coop Board Wargame The Shores of Tripoli Fort Circle Games
Magazine Board Wargame Battle for Kursk: The Tigers Are Burning, 1943   C3i #34
Amateur/Print & Play Wargame Kettle Hill
Postcard/Small Format Board Wargame Lucky Little Luxembourg
Best Board Wargame Expansion Labyrinth: The Forever War, 2015-?
Board Wargame Playing Components The Jaws of Victory: Battle of Korsun-Cherkassy Pocket – January/February 1944  New England Simulations
Board Wargame Map Graphics Imperial Struggle GMT
Wargame Rules The Jaws of Victory: Battle of Korsun-Cherkassy Pocket – January/February 1944  New England Simulations and The Shores of Tripoli Fort Circle Games
Original Box Cover Art The Shores of Tripoli Fort Circle Games
Amateur Wargame Magazine Punched
Professional Wargame Magazine C3I
Wargame Analysis / Game Review / Analysis website, webcast, podcast The Player’s Aid
Individual Historical Article or Scenario Analysis  Wargaming in the Department of Defense — U.S. Army Command and General Staff College Common Core: Wargaming in the Joint Planning Process* – Eric Walters https://community.consimworld.com/post/wargaming-in-the-department-of-defense—-u-s-army-command-and-general-staf–604288efc993d26724d570206.
Military History Book Twilight of the Gods: War in the Western Pacific 1944-1945 by Ian Toll 
Wargame of the Year Verdun 1916: Steel Inferno Fellowship of Simulations
Dunnigan Award for Design Excellence Verdun 1916: Steel Inferno Walter Vejdovsky
Clausewitz Hall of Fame recipient Walter Vejdovsky

2021
Source:
Best Ancients to Medieval Era Board Wargame: Rome, Inc., Against the Odds, designer Phillip Jelley
Best Early Gunpowder Board Wargame 1453-1793 AD: Bayonets & Tomahawks, GMT Games, designer Marc Rodrigue
Best Late Gunpowder to Pre-World War I Board Wargame, excluding American Civil War and Napoleonic Topics: Red Flag Over Paris, GMT Games, designer Fred Serval
Best Napoleonic Board Wargame: Napoleon Invades Spain, Operational Studies Group, designer Kevin Zucker
Best American Civil War Board Wargame: Hood Strikes North, Multi-Man Publishing, designers Joseph M. Balkoski, Ed Beach & Chris Withers
Best World War I Era Board Wargame: Decisive Victory 1918: Soissons, Legion Wargames, designers Serge Bettencourt, Tim Gale
Best World War II Era Board Wargame: Atlantic Chase, GMT Games, designer Jeremy White
Best Modern Era Board Wargame: NATO: The Cold War Goes Hot, Compass Games, designer Bruce Maxwell
Best Science-Fiction or Fantasy Board Wargame: Oath: Chronicles of Empire and Exile, Leder Games, designer Cole Wehrle
Best Solitaire or Cooperative Board Wargame: Atlantic Chase, GMT Games, designer Jeremy White
Best Magazine Board Wargame: Hannut: France 1940, Decision Games, designer Joe Youst
Best Expansion or Supplement for an Existing Board Wargame: Undaunted: Reinforcements, Osprey Games, designers David Thompson & Trevor Benjamin
Best Board Wargame Playing Components: Atlantic Chase, GMT Games
Best Board Wargame Map Graphics: Bayonets & Tomahawks, GMT Games, map artist Marc Rodrigue
Best Board Wargame Rules: Atlantic Chase, GMT Games, designer Jeremy White
Best Cover Art: Storm Above the Reich, GMT Games, box artists Mark Simonitch & Antonis Karidis
Best Computer Wargame:  War in the East 2, Slitherine, Ltd.
Best Wargame Magazine: C3i, RBM Studios
Best Individual Historical, Scenario Analysis, or Book: Wayne Hansen, “Let’s Play! Devil Boats: PT Boats in the Solomons Overview & Review”
Best Game Review or Analysis Website, Webcast, or Podcast: The Player’s Aid (Blog & YouTube)
Wargame of the Year: Atlantic Chase, GMT Games, designer Jeremy White
James F. Dunnigan Design Elegance Award: David Thompson
Clausewitz Award Hall of Fame: Chad Jensen
Charles S. Roberts Best New Designer Award: Marc Rodrigue

Previous award winners
Source:

1974 to 1975 – Best Professional Game

1974 to 1975, 1978 – Best Amateur Game

1976 to 1977 – Best Tactical Game

1976 to 1977 – Best Strategic Game

1978 to 1986 – Best Pre-20th century Game

1978 to 1986 – Best 20th century Game

1987 to 2008 – Best Pre–World War Two Game

2009 to 2012 – Best Ancient to Napoleonic Era Board Wargame

2009 to 2012 – Best Post-Napoleonic to Pre–World War II Era Board Wargame

1987 to 2012 – Best World War Two Game

1987 to 2012 – Best Post–World War Two or Modern Game

1999 to 2012 – Best DTP Game (or Print and Play, from 2009)

1999 to 2012 – Best Magazine Game

2009 to 2012 – Best Expansion or Supplement for an Existing Game

1974 to 2012 – Best Professional Wargaming Magazine

1974 to 2012 – Best Amateur Wargaming Magazine

 – formerly Swabbers

1987 to 2012 – Best Historical or Scenario Magazine Article

 – only Honorable Mentions

1987 to 2012 – Best Game Review or Game Analysis

1976 to 2012 – Best Wargame Graphics

1979 to 1981 – Best Initial Release Wargame

1977 to 1986 and 2010 to 2012 – Best Fantasy or Science Fiction Wargame

1989 to 2012 – James F. Dunnigan Award for Playability and Design
To a Game Designer, Developer, Graphic Artist or Game for outstanding achievement in that year

 – In 1989 and 1991 the game won the award.

Leading CSR award winners for wargames (1974 to 2011)
These totals include awards for games, magazine games, game graphics and (for designers) the James F. Dunnigan award. Not included are awards for magazines, computer media and articles.

by game company
47 – GMT Games LLC
16 – Multi-Man Publishing
13 – The Gamers Incorporated
12 – The Avalon Hill Game Company
12 – Victory Games
10 – Decision Games
9 – XTR Corporation
6 – Simulation Publications Incorporated
6 – Against the Odds Magazine
5 – Game Designers' Workshop
4 – World Wide Wargames
4 – West End Games
3 – Clash of Arms
3 – Khyber Pass Games

by game designer or graphic artist
16 – Dean Essig
13 – Rodger MacGowan
9 – Richard Berg
8 – Ted Raicer
6 – Joe Miranda
6 – Mark Herman
5 – Volko Ruhnke
5 – Mark Simonitch
4 – John Prados
4 – Ted Koller
4 – Nicolas Eskubi
3 – Frank Chadwick
3 – Joseph Balkoski
3 – Greg Costikyan
3 – Dan Verssen
3 – Charles Kibler

See also
 Charles S. Roberts
 Origins Awards
 World Boardgaming Championships

References

External links 
 Charles S. Roberts Awards Home Page. 
  
 

Game awards
Awards established in 1975